Kobylice  is a village in the administrative district of Gmina Cisek, within Kędzierzyn-Koźle County, Opole Voivodeship, in southern Poland.

The village has a population of 527.

History
The name of the village is of Polish origin and comes from the word kobyła, which means "mare". In the late 19th century, it had an almost entirely Catholic population of 456.

References

External links 
 Jewish Community in Kobylice on Virtual Shtetl

Kobylice